John Frederick Adair (20 January 1852 – 1 April 1913) was an Irish mathematician and physicist who taught in England and Australia.  He was a keen cricketer who played first-class cricket for Cambridge University in 1875.

Adair was born at St Stephen's Green, Dublin, the son of John Adair, a lawyer. He studied at Trinity College Dublin being a scholar in 1871 and being awarded BA in mathematics in 1873. In 1874 he was admitted at Pembroke College, Cambridge and was awarded BA in mathematics (7th Wrangler) in 1878. From 1878 and 1879 he was an assistant master at Derby School and from 1887 to 1890 he was a demonstrator in physics at the University of Sydney. Adair died at Ballsbridge, County Dublin, Ireland at the age of 61.

Cricket
Adair played cricket for Trinity College, Dublin between 1870 and 1874.
 While at Derby school he played one cricket match for Derbyshire against their Colts. He also played for I Zingari. In 1874 he was admitted at Pembroke College, Cambridge, and while at Cambridge played one cricket match for Cambridge University and one against the university for an England XI led by WG Grace. In 1883 Adair played cricket for an Ireland side.

Papers 
 On the Velocity of Transmission through Sea-Water of Disturbances of Large Amplitude Caused by Explosions (with Richard Threlfall) Proceedings of the Royal Society of London, Volume 46, pp. 496–541, 1889

References

External links

Irish cricketers
Cambridge University cricketers
Irish physicists
Alumni of Trinity College Dublin
Alumni of Pembroke College, Cambridge
Fellows of Pembroke College, Cambridge
Academic staff of the University of Sydney
1852 births
1913 deaths
People from Ballsbridge